Events from the year 1821 in Sweden.

Incumbents
 Monarch – Charles XIV John

Events
 – First issue of the newly merged Post- och Inrikes Tidningar.
 27 March – The Wolf of Gysinge was killed after having attacked 31 people over a three-month period.

Births
 24 February - Sven Adolf Hedlund, newspaper publisher and politician   (died 1900) 
 2 March – Axel Adlercreutz,  politician, civil servant, President of the Göta Court of Appeal, Prime Minister for Justice  (died 1880) 
 1 April – Geskel Saloman,  portrait and genre painter  (died 1902) 
 6 May - Emelie Holmberg, composer, singer, pianist, music teacher and organist  (died 1854)
 21 September – Aurora Ljungstedt, horror writer  (died 1908) 
 13 October – Oscar Byström,  composer  (died 1909) 
 - Fanny Stål, classical pianist  (died 1889)

Deaths
 15 March - Abraham Niclas Edelcrantz, poet and inventor   (born 1754)
 6 October – Anders Jahan Retzius, chemist, botanist and entomologist  (born 1742)

References

 
Years of the 19th century in Sweden
Sweden